Colonial goods stores are retailers of foods and other consumer goods imported from European colonies, called colonial goods. During the nineteenth century, they formed a distinct category of retailer in much of Europe, specializing in coffee, tea, spices, rice, sugar, cocoa and chocolate, and tobacco.

By the mid-twentieth century, these stores had become general grocery stores selling a variety of commodities that were easy to store, as contrasted with greengrocers, butchers, bakers, fishmongers, and so on. With the advent of supermarkets, the name "colonial stores" continued to be used, despite the end of colonialism, for small, independent stores.

Such stores existed across Europe. In German, they were called  'colonial goods', in French,  'colonial store', in Italian,  'colonials', and in Spanish and Portuguese,  'overseas (goods)'. The luxury grocer Hédiard started as a colonial goods store, originally named . In Britain, Home and Colonial Stores became a major retail chain.

Decline and legacy

Germanic and Nordic countries
By the end of the twentieth century, the term had largely fallen out of use, while the items in which colonial goods retailers had specialized had long since been included in the wider range of goods offered by general purpose supermarkets. Where colonial goods shops survived, they were regarded as old-fashioned, and tended to be known in Germany and Switzerland as Aunt Emma Shops, that is, "mom and pop" stores. In Austria the etymologically convoluted term Greißler is used. In Germany the earlier term is still used in Bremen by the William Holtorf Colonial Goods Shop, founded in 1874, which claims to be Germany's last colonial goods shop.

Germany's largest (in 2014) supermarket group, Edeka, preserved the word in its full name, . In Denmark and Norway, the term  is still commonly used by supermarkets.

United Kingdom

In the 1920s, "empire shops" were proposed by the Empire Marketing Board as a promotional vehicle for foods from the British Empire. In the end, none of these shops opened. A public art exhibit in London in 2016 used the empire shops as a way of thinking about postcolonialism and globalization.

See also
 Colonial exhibition

Notes

Food retailing
Goods